Don Corleone may refer to:

 Vito Corleone, the original Don in The Godfather, played by Marlon Brando and Robert De Niro
 Michael Corleone, Vito's son, played by Al Pacino, who took over the control of the family
 Vincent Corleone, Sonny's illegitimate son, played by Andy Garcia, who became Michael's successor and the third Don Corleone

See also
Don Corleon (born 1978), Jamaican record producer, songwriter, and mixer